Tejdanu (also Romanized as Tejdānū and Tajdanoo; also known as Nezhdānlū and Tizdānu) is a village in Nurabad Rural District, in the Central District of Manujan County, Kerman Province, Iran. At the 2006 census, its population was 885, in 219 families.

References 

Populated places in Manujan County